Pleurochayah is an extinct genus of bothremydid turtle from the Lewisville Member of the Woodbine Formation in Texas. It is monotypic, with only type species P. appalachius known.<ref name="adrianetal2021"/

References

Fossil taxa described in 2021
Prehistoric turtle genera
Late Cretaceous turtles of North America
Bothremydidae